is a Japanese actress, a J-Pop singer, and an idol who came to fame in the 1980s.

Biography 
Yui was born in Miyazaki, Miyazaki, Japan, and later attended Nakano High School. In 1984, she was the Grand Prix Winner for a Young Girls Comics Magazine. Yui was featured as the main character of the comic "Shooting Star". A year later, she debuted as a singer with the single Natsu Shoujo. Up until the end of 1986, Asaka enjoyed a moderately successful career as a singer and an idol.

Her fame grew when she starred in the third series of cult TV Show Sukeban Deka in 1987. In 1989, she starred as the heroine of popular manga Yawara! A Fashionable Judo Girl in its 1989 live movie adaptation. Capitalising on this exposure, Asaka started to write her own songs, starting with the single "Self Control".

In 1993, problems arose when her management began limiting her rights concerning her stage name (Yui Asaka). Asaka decided to temporarily withdraw from the limelight and took a break from show business. Her former label Hummingbird was acquired by Warner Music Japan the following year. She returned to the music scene in 1997 as Yui (not to be confused with another Japanese singer called Yui). Soon after, Asaka reconciled with her agency and was allowed to perform under the name "Yui Asaka" once more. Asaka decided to focus on her acting career, frequently appearing in Japanese TV dramas and variety shows (see full discography below).

Discography

Albums 
 1986.02.21 :  Crystal Eyes
 1987.02.28 :  Star Lights
 1987.09.23 :  Rainbow
 1988.06.01 :  Candid Girl
 1988.12.01 :  Herstory
 1989.03.01 :  Melody Fair
 1989.11.21 :  Pride
 1990.02.28 :  Nude Songs
 1990.07.04 :  Open your Eyes - Nude Songs vol.2
 1990.12.05 :  No Lookin' Back
 1991.08.21 :  Stay
 1992.08.21 :  Joker
 1993.02.24 :  Contrast

Best-of albums 
 1987.12.01 :  Present
 1989.05.18 :  Yawara! Original Soundtrack
 1991.02.27 :  Thanks a lot
 1992.11.25 :  Single Collection
 1993.05.01 :  Anniversary2824
 1993.07.21 :  Asaka Yui Daizenshou (浅香唯大全集)
 2005.06.22 :  Kyoukyoku no Best! Asaka Yui (究極のベスト! 浅香唯)
 2010.06.09 :  Crystals - 25th Anniversary Best
 2010.07.07 :  Kami Jacket CD Box (Album+DVD)

Singles 
 1985.06.21 :  夏少女 (Natsu Shoujo)
 1985.09.25 :  ふたりのMoon River (Futari no Moon River)
 1986.01.21 :  ヤッパシ…H! (Yappashi...H!)
 1986.05.21 :  コンプレックスBanzai!! (Complex Banzai!!)
 1986.09.21 :  10月のクリスマス (10gatsu no Christmas) #88
 1987.01.21 :  STAR #9
 1987.05.27 :  瞳にStorm (Hitomi ni Storm) #4
 1987.09.09 :  虹のDreamer (Niji no Dreamer) #1
 1987.10.14 :  Remember (with Onishi Yuka and Nakamura Yuma) #1
 1988.01.27 :  Believe Again #2
 1988.04.20 :  C-Girl #1
 1988.08.18 :  セシル (Cecile) #1
 1988.11.02 :  Melody #2
 1989.01.25 :  True Love #1
 1989.03.22 :  Neverland～Yawara!メインテーマ～ (Neverland ~ Yawara! Main Theme) #2
 1989.07.05 :  恋のロックンロール・サーカス (Koi no Rock n' Roll Circus) #4
 1989.09.17 :  Dream Power #3
 1990.02.07 :  Chance! #7
 1990.05.31 :  7days Girl
 1990.06.06 :  ボーイフレンドをつくろう (Boyfriend wo Tsukurou) #10
 1990.10.31 :  Self Control #13
 1991.06.06 :  恋のUpside-Down (Koi no Upside-Down) #32
 1992.01.29 :  愛しい人と眠りたい (Itoshii Hito to Nemuritai) #42
 1993.02.24 :  ひとり (Hitori)
 1997.09.26 :  Ring Ring Ring (YUI)
 1998.08.26 :  不器用な天使 (Bukiyou na Tenshi) (YUI)
 2000.12.26 :  白の扉 (Shiro no Tobira)
 2005.12.26 :  笑顔の私 (Egao no Watashi)
 2009.05.20 :  マジ？マジ！マジカル☆ジュエル (Maji? Maji! Magical Jewel)

Filmography

Dramas 
 1985 :  Ikkyuusan
 1987 :  Sukeban Deka III: Shoujo Ninpou Chou Denki
 1988 :  Kanou Juuban Shoubu!
 1990 :  AD Boogie
 1991 :  Yo ni mo Kimyou na Monogatari
 1992 :  Saimon Selection
 1992 :  Nani mo Ienakute
 1999 :  Yo ni mo Kimyou na Monogatari '99 Aki no Tokubetsuhen "Wafuku no Shoujo"
 2000 :  Tadaima Manshitsu
 2000 :  Quiz
 2000 :  Kyoto Gion Irimuko Keijijikenbo 6
 2001 :  Handoc!!!
 2002 :  Kamaitachi no Yoru
 2003 :  Satsujin Roke
 2004 :  Rikon Yoteibi
 2005 :  Mama! I Love You
 2006 :  Virus Panic 2006 Natsu -Machi wa Kansenshita-
 2011 : Taira no Kiyomori

Films 
 1987:  Sukeban Deka: The Movie
 1988:  Sukeban Deka: Kazama San Shimai no Gyakushū
 1989:  YAWARA!
 2001:  Dosaken Mahjong Jigoku
 2010:  Kurosawa Eiga

References

External links 
 
 Yui Asaka on Idollica
 Yui Asaka on Oricon 
 

1969 births
Living people
Japanese idols
Japanese women pop singers
Musicians from Miyazaki Prefecture
Warner Music Japan artists
20th-century Japanese actresses
21st-century Japanese actresses
20th-century Japanese women singers
20th-century Japanese singers
21st-century Japanese women singers
21st-century Japanese singers
People of Shōwa-period Japan
People from Miyazaki (city)